Gwynns Falls/Leakin Park is the largest woodland park in an East Coast city, constituting a contiguous area of . Envisioned as a "stream valley park" to protect Baltimore's watersheds like the Gwynns Falls from overdevelopment and to preserve their natural habitats, Gwynns Falls/Leakin Park today offers a rare opportunity for the public to explore a diverse natural environment characterized by stream valleys, ridge tops, and meadows; enjoy opportunities for active recreation; and experience historic structures from an earlier era.

Gwynns Falls/Leakin Park, designated as part of the Baltimore National Heritage Area, is managed and maintained by Baltimore City Department of Recreation and Parks, assisted and supported by volunteers of the Friends of Gwynns Falls/Leakin Park (FoGFLP).

Overview 
Along its borders are 20 of the city's neighborhoods. Today's visitors may find themselves agreeing with an 1831 traveler who expressed surprise at discovering the valley's "wild and beautiful scenery [...] so near the city, surrounded by all the various majestic features of a rocky mountainous country".

Outdoor recreation

The Eagle Drive Entrance to the Crimea section 

Along Windsor Mill Road, the Eagle Drive Entrance to the park provides access to railroad-themed park amenities: the historic structures of railroad builder Thomas Winans, as well as such family activities as miniature train rides and a railroad playground. Features from the Winans Crimea Estate era include the stone Orianda mansion and carriage house and the Carpenters Gothic Winans Chapel—all three on the City's list of historic landmarks. Visitor parking is located near the entrance.

Facilities in this section include the headquarters of the Chesapeake Bay Outward Bound School, with its outdoor activities programs. A short walk brings you to the Carrie Murray Nature Center (CMNC), named for the mother of Baltimore Orioles great Eddie Murray, with year-round programs providing young people opportunities "to meet live animals, explore the park, and develop a relationship with the natural world". For active recreation, this section includes tennis courts, with plans for improved sports playfields, and access to woodland trails. There is also a grove of 28 saucer magnolias (Magnolia × soulangeana) and three sweetbay magnolias (Magnolia virginiana) that volunteers have recently saved from encroaching invasive vines. In early to mid-April, when the Magnolia Grove comes into full bloom, it is one of the must see spots in Baltimore.

Gwynns Falls Trail, Leon Day Park, and Winans Meadow 

The Gwynns Falls Trail extends the length of Gwynns Falls/Leakin Park from the terminus of Interstate 70 (I-70) to Wilkens Avenue, then proceeds with alternate destinations to the Inner Harbor and the Middle Branch. Constructed in stages from 1999 to 2008, the trail opened the stream valley to active recreational use for hikers and bikers, with trailheads and provision for parking along the route. Interpretive panels tell the history of the stream valley.

The project also contributed new amenities along Franklintown Road for Gwynns Falls/Leakin Park, creating playfields that were designated Leon Day Park, in honor of Baltimore's Negro league's great Leon Day. It also provided greater public access to the park at Winans Meadow, including visitor parking, a covered pavilion for group use on a permit basis, and access to trails that extend from the valley to the park's uphill ridges.

Other hiking trails 
The park is an ideal spot for walking, hiking, running, bicycling, and dog walking, although some would say that being in the presence of an abundance of nature tops the list. There are approximately 18 identified hiking trails in Gwynns Falls/Leakin Park that are listed on the park's trail map. Most of the trails are in the Winans Meadow and Crimea areas of the park. Trails are unpaved with the exception of a few trails that utilize sections of the Gwynns Falls Trail. Trails fall into the easy to moderate level with some rocky sections, rolling hills, and the occasional muddy area.

A popular trail is Heide's Trail, formerly the Ridge Trail, which runs along a ridge in an east–west direction, allowing for beautiful views of Winans Meadow and the Dead Run stream in the valley and several stands of very tall old trees. Along the Old Fort Trail, there are several historic structures from the Winans Estate and, depending on the season, a great view of the back of the Orianda Mansion.

There are 10 short hiking trails in the Winans Meadow area (accessible from Franklintown Road) and the Crimea area (accessible from Windsor Mill Road), which permit hikes of varying lengths, challenges and exposures. Longer hikes can be taken into different sections of the park via the Gwynns Falls Trail, the Dickeyville spur, the Windsor Hills Conservation Trail, and other trails that parallel Gwynns Falls. The Millrace section of the Gwynns Falls Trail (once a water power source for mills downstream and the only part of the route not paved) is a particularly scenic area with exceptional view of the Gwynns Falls. Parking for this section is available at the Windsor Mill Road Trailhead of the Gwynns Falls Trail.

Many hiking options are available to meet the desires of beginner and seasoned hikers and explorers. There is a historic estate to explore, relatively undisturbed forest areas, streams, a Sacred Labyrinth, a restored Magnolia Grove, and of course, the birds, bees, and other wildlife that make Gwynns Falls/Leakin Park their home.

Activities and events

Carrie Murray Nature Center 

Carrie Murray Nature Center (CMNC) is operated by Baltimore City Recreation and Parks, and it offers environmental education programs for children, families and adults. Their programs serve an estimated 30,000 visitors annually, serving individuals and families as well as groups from schools, faith-based groups, recreation centers, and camps. During the school year, the nature center offers field trips and outreach programs for students of all ages, including the Wild Haven forest immersion program for preschool-age children. They also offer summer camps, public programs, special events, and volunteer opportunities.

Chesapeake Bay Outward Bound School 
Chesapeake Bay Outward Bound School is an educational nonprofit that operates one of its two campusses inside Gwynns Falls/Leakin Park. Their character education programs focus on teaching social–emotional learning (SEL) skills to middle and high school youth, with programs available for educators, professional teams, and veterans as well. The school has served nearly 100,000 students since being established in 1986, over 90 percent of which receive some form of scholarship to attend Outward Bound. Programs range from one-day high ropes teambuilding to multiweek wilderness expeditions taking students backpacking, rock climbing, canoeing, or sea kayaking across the Chesapeake Bay region.

Second Sundays in the park 
On those days, the FoGFLP provide information, family-friendly activities, and visits to the historic structures. The CMNC is also open for visitors.

Baltimore Herb Festival 
A group of volunteers who had been active in the fight against the expressway decided to conduct the Baltimore Herb Festival as an annual event in the park, with proceeds going toward its maintenance and preservation. The first festival, held in 1987, proved successful in attracting a large crowd, but it ended in tragedy when lightning from an abrupt thunderstorm struck the chapel where many had taken refuge, injuring several and taking one life. Despite this bittersweet inaugural event, the festival has continued to be held annually on the Saturday of Memorial Day weekend, drawing about 2,000 visitors to the park for the event, which features herb and plant vendors, displays by area organizations, food, and musical entertainment.

Leakin Park Parkrun 
Leakin Park Parkrun is a free weekly 5K run held on Saturday mornings, starting at Winan's Meadow near Ben Cardin Pavilion

Volunteer opportunities 
The nonprofit organization Friends of Gwynns Falls Leakin Park (FoGFLP) organizes volunteers to perform ongoing maintenance of the park, including daily trash collection, trail work, tree plantings, and gardening. They also provide assistance by supplying maps to visitors, monitoring park usage, reporting conditions to Baltimore City Recreation & Parks, and much more. FoGFLP also sponsors annual activities, such as the MLK Day of Service, the First Day Hike, seasonal hikes, and the Black Friday Hike.

History

Establishing the parks: the Olmsted role 
Gwynns Falls/Leakin Park traces its earliest history to a small tract near Edmondson and Hilton avenues, designated in 1901 as the Gwynns Falls Reserve. In 1904, as the city anticipated expanding its borders through annexation, the highly regarded Olmsted firm proposed creating "stream valley parks" to protect distinctive watersheds like the Gwynns Falls from future development and secure them as natural preserves. Over the next decades, the Olmsteds worked with the city in its acquisition of park land extending to Windsor Mill Road.

In 1926, following the 1918 annexation, the city again commissioned the Olmsteds for a study of park needs in 1950. This report recommended extending Gwynns Falls Park northward along the stream to the city boundary. It also urged acquiring the valley of a tributary, the Dead Run, "considered by all who view it as one of the very best bits of scenery near Baltimore".

In 1939, Frederick Law Olmsted Jr. was again consulted, this time to evaluate options for the use of the bequest of Baltimore lawyer J. Wilson Leakin for the establishment of a park in the name of his grandfather, a former city mayor. The issue was politically contentious, as various sections of the city competed for selection. Olmsted Jr. strongly recommended acquisition of the Winans Estate, Crimea, which included the valley of the Dead Run and the heights above, as "so nearly in condition, just as it now is, to be a very beautiful and valuable park". The availability of the Winans Estate for purchase as late as the 1940s offered a rare opportunity for a park acquisition of this size within the city limits. With purchases in 1941 and 1948, the city created Leakin Park, the name adhering to the bequest. Since Gwynns Falls and Leakin Parks are contiguous, over time, the city's Department of Recreation and Parks came to designate the combined parklands as Gwynns Falls/Leakin Park.

The Winans Estate 
The Winans Estate, acquired to become Leakin Park, was property purchased by Thomas DeKay Winans in the 1850s. The son of Baltimore and Ohio Railroad builder Ross Winans, Thomas had accompanied his brother William to Russia in the 1840s to construct that country's first railroad, connecting Saint Petersburg and Moscow. While there, Thomas met and married his wife Celeste. Upon completion of the project, the Winans returned to the US in the early 1850s with considerable wealth. Establishing their home as a city mansion, they purchased property in the countryside, naming their estate the Crimea and their country home Orianda—names evoking the Russia where they met. At Celeste's request, the couple erected a chapel for the religious needs of the Irish workers on the estate. Sadly, Celeste died shortly after its completion in 1861.

Three structures in the park from the Winans era—the stone Orianda mansion and carriage house and the wooden chapel—have been designated Baltimore City Landmarks; they are easily visible from the park's Eagle Drive. The hillside and valley below also feature remnants from the Winans period, including the ruins of a mock fort and farm buildings, as well as an iron water wheel—one of the park's most visited sites—apparently designed to pump water up to the mansion. These sites are accessible by hiking trails from Eagle Drive or from the Winans Meadow parking entrance along Franklintown Road.

Expressway threat 

Shortly after the establishment of Leakin Park, it and adjacent Gwynns Falls Park were threatened when funding for the federal Interstate Highway System fueled local plans that envisioned the route of an east–west bisecting their lands. As plans developed and acquisition of properties got underway, community activists in various communities across the city organized in opposition. A group committed to protecting the parks took the name of Volunteers Opposed to Leakin Park Expressway (VOLPE, the acronym a play on the name of the federal Secretary of Transportation). Taking their opposition to court, VOLPE won a partial victory in 1972 when federal judge James Rogers Miller Jr. ruled that provision for hearings on the park route had been "legally insufficient" and ordered new ones to allow full consideration of the environmental impact of the highway plans. In response, a Baltimore Sun editorial acknowledged the need to address transportation demands, but wondered, "Must a city destroy parks, dwellings and businesses in order to accommodate the automobile?"

Protracted hearings and court proceedings due to the activism of expressway opponents had the effect of prolonging the roadway plans past funding deadlines. By 1980, with time to use or lose the funds pressing, city officials reached the decision to abandon the proposed route through the park.

Pipeline controversy 

In 2013, the FoGFLP learned of a Baltimore Gas and Electric (BGE) plan to run a new natural gas pipeline for a  distance through the park, threatening a substantial number of the park's trees. BGE spokespersons explained the new line would replace an original one installed with park department permission in 1949, which was now facing considerable maintenance problems. However, a new line could not follow the existing route due to current environmental regulations protecting wetlands, so the proposed new route would run along the ridge near the southern border of the park. Especially troubling to FoGFLP leaders was BGE's requirement that the construction phase would entail a  clearcut corridor requiring removal of a large number of the park's finest trees, to be maintained at  afterward for repair access and monitoring. In an editorial on the controversy, The Baltimore Sun insisted that "BGE must work with the city and other stakeholders to find the least damaging route for a new gas line through the area". In response to the concerns raised, BGE agreed to consider an alternative northerly route through the park, following existing park roads, minimizing tree loss, and impacting fewer residences by its proximity to them. After four years of dialogue and studies of route feasibility, BGE began construction along the alternative route in 2018, completing the work in the autumn of 2019. Following completion, 870 replacement trees were planted along edges of the corridor. As Baltimore Sun writer Tim Wheeler observed in 2013, "One of the largest urban woodland parks in the eastern United States appears destined to become less wooded."

Sewer line access roads 

Baltimore City and County, for the most part, have gravity fed sewers, meaning the trunk lines for the sewers go through the stream valleys, including the Gwynns Falls and Dead Run. These sewers were built in the early 20th century, and, by the late 1980s, their deterioration was causing problems with the water quality in the streams. The city of Baltimore entered into a consent decree with the Environmental Protection Agency (EPA), the Department of Justice (DOJ), and the Maryland Department of the Environment (MDE) on September 30, 2002, to address sanitary sewer overflows. While promising a future with better water quality in the city's urban streams and harbor, it has meant the clearing of mature forest to create access roads in the millrace area of the park. This is the area along the east side of the Gwynns Falls between Windsor Mill Road and the Dead Run, continuing along the south side of the Falls after its confluence with Dead Run almost to the Franklintown Road bridge. , CCTV inspections of the sewer lines in Leakin Park were ongoing.

Overcoming a stigma 

By the end of the 20th century, Leakin Park and its environs had garnered a negative reputation as a place where the remains of local suicide and murder victims were often found. Because of this association the park began to be morbidly called by locals "the city's largest unregistered graveyard".

Though holding an odious aura in the minds of some because of this lingering reputation, the park is actually known by local area residents to be a safe and restorative place to hike in the woods, bike on paved trails, and enjoy playgrounds. Molly Gallant, a planner with the Baltimore City Department of Recreation and Parks, led successful efforts to change the park's reputation, starting in 2011 with a community-based campout in the park and the closure of dead-end access roads. The Gwynns Falls Trail (which extends from the terminus of I-70 to the Inner Harbor) is a model urban hiking and biking trail that runs around and through Gwynns Falls/Leakin Park, welcoming cyclists and hikers from around the region. In the words of Rona Kobell, a former Baltimore Sun reporter writing on Slate,

Murders 
More than 75 deceased individuals have been identified and found scattered throughout the park between 1946 and 2017. Most incidents are recorded as murders in Baltimore Sun newspaper and City Paper articles. A significant percentage of those found were killed elsewhere and their bodies disposed of inside the park.

References

External links 
 Friends of Gwynns Falls/Leakin Park
 Gwynns Falls Trail Map of Gwynns Falls Trail with Gwynns Falls/Leakin Park
 Carrie Murray Nature Center
 Chesapeake Bay Outward Bound School
 Nature Art in the Park image collection at the Internet Archive
 Baltimore Herb Festival
 Crimea Estate at Leakin Park at Explore Baltimore Heritage
 Chesapeake & Allegheny Live Steamers
 Orianda mansion

Baltimore National Heritage Area
Parks in Baltimore